The spectacled sea snake or King's sea snake (Hydrophis kingii) is sea snake in the family Elapidae. It is native to waters off northern Australia and the southern coast of New Guinea.

References

Hydrophis
Snakes of Asia
Snakes of Australia
Reptiles of Western Australia
Reptiles of the Northern Territory
Reptiles of Queensland
Reptiles of Western New Guinea
Reptiles of Papua New Guinea
Reptiles of the Indian Ocean
Reptiles described in 1896
Taxa named by George Albert Boulenger